Millettia capuronii is a species of plant in the family Fabaceae. It is found only in Madagascar.

The Latin specific epithet of capuronii is in honor of the French botanist René Capuron.
It was first published in Novon Vol.5 on page 171 in 1995.

References

capuronii
Endemic flora of Madagascar
Vulnerable plants
Taxonomy articles created by Polbot
Plants described in 1995